MŠK Považská Bystrica is a handball club from Považská Bystrica, Slovakia, that plays in the Niké Handball Extraliga.

Crest, colours, supporters

Kit manufacturers

Kits

Management

Team

Current squad 

Squad for the 2022–23 season

Technical staff
 Head coach:  Václav Straka
 Assistant coach:  Peter Valášek
 Fitness coach:  Miroslav Smataník
 Physiotherapist:  Matej Drbul
 Club doctor:  Dr. Vladimír Fábry

Transfers

Transfers for the 2022–23 season

Joining 
  Ľubomír Ďuriš (CB) from  Gyöngyösi KK

Leaving

Previous Squads

Accomplishments
National Championship of Slovakia: (3) 
2002, 2003, 2006
National Cup of Slovakia: (4)
2001, 2006, 2019, 2022
EHF Champions League
 Group Stage (2): 2003/04, 2006/07

EHF ranking

Former club members

Notable former players

  Peter Kukučka (1992–2003)
  Václav Straka (2005–2007, 2008–2009)
  Ondřej Zdráhala (2012–2013)

Former coaches

References

External links
 
 

Slovak handball clubs
Sport in Trenčín Region